The Bush Rugby Football Union is a former provincial rugby union team from New Zealand, existing between 1890 and 1971.

The union was formed on 19 April 1890 at Pahiatua by the Pahiatua, Woodville and Eketahuna rugby football clubs. The original plan was to include Dannevirke and name the team "70 Mile Bush", but the Dannevirke club instead opted to remain part of Hawke's Bay

In 1971 Bush amalgamated with the Wairarapa Rugby Football Union to form Wairarapa Bush Rugby Football Union. In 1950 the Wairarapa and Bush unions put up a combined team to play the touring British Lions, losing 13–27

Ranfurly Shield
Bush had seven unsuccessful challenges for the Ranfurly Shield between 1927 and 1968:
 1927: Wairarapa 53 vs Bush 3, at Masterton
 1928: Wairarapa 57 vs Bush 11, at Masterton
 1939: Southland 38 vs Bush 0, at Invercargill
 1957: Wellington 22 vs Bush 9, at Wellington
 1962: Auckland 46 vs Bush 6, at Auckland
 1965: Taranaki 33 vs Bush 6, at New Plymouth
 1968: Hawke's Bay 36 vs Bush 6, at Napier

All Blacks
Bush had only one All Black during their existence, Athol "Tonk" Mahoney who represented New Zealand in 26 matches between 1929 and 1936. Mahoney also played 36 matches for the Bush union between 1927 and 1939.

References

Defunct New Zealand rugby union teams
Defunct New Zealand rugby union governing bodies
1890 establishments in New Zealand
1971 disestablishments in New Zealand